Beddoes is a surname of Welsh origin . Notable people with the name include:

 Alex Beddoes (born 1995), athlete from the Cook Islands
 Clayton Beddoes (born 1970), Canadian ice hockey coach and player
 Dick Beddoes (c. 1926–1991), Canadian sports journalist
 Emma Beddoes (born 1985), English squash player
 Ivor Beddoes (1909–1981), British matte painter, costume and set designer, and artist
 Lance Beddoes (born 1992), New Zealand squash player
 Mick Beddoes, Fijian politician and businessman
 Ronald Beddoes (1912–2000), Anglican priest
 Thomas Beddoes (1760–1808), English physician and scientific writer
 Thomas Lovell Beddoes (1803–1849), English poet, dramatist and physician
 Zanny Minton Beddoes (born 1967), British journalist

See also
 Bedo (disambiguation)
 Beddoe

Surnames of Welsh origin